The Christmas Island shrew (Crocidura trichura), also known as the Christmas Island musk-shrew is an extremely rare or possibly extinct shrew from Christmas Island. It was variously placed as subspecies of the Asian gray shrew (Crocidura attenuata) or the Southeast Asian shrew (Crocidura fuliginosa), but morphological differences and the large distance between the species indicate that it is an entirely distinct species.

Description 
The Christmas Island shrew, like other members of the genus Crocidura, is a small short-legged mammal with a distinct pointed muzzle. It has a dark grey to reddish brown colouring. Like all other shrews, the Christmas Island shrew resembles a mouse and weighs in a range between 4.5g-6g. The Christmas Island shrew varies from other forms of the species in that it is beset with long fine hairs, and its tail is much greater in length. The typical lifespan for its genus is approximately one year, but Crocidurine shrews have been reported to live for up to two years in the wild.

Habitat 
The Christmas Island shrew is a terrestrial animal that occupies tall plateau rainforests with deep soil, as well as the shallow soil of terrace rainforests. It remains unknown if the species can live in secondary growth. This shrew feeds primarily on small beetles and uses holes in rocks and tree roots for shelter.

Status 
The most recent specimens of C. trichura were found in 1985, although a survey conducted fifteen years later failed to find any individuals. The current population trend is unknown.

According to Version 3.1 of the IUCN's criteria for critically endangered, endangered, and vulnerable species, C. trichura is critically endangered and possibly extinct.

Causes for endangerment 
There is conclusive evidence that Crocidura trichura has declined dramatically since 1900, yet the reason is unproven. After an unconfirmed sighting in 1958, it was rediscovered in 1985 when two specimens were caught. The two individuals later died. Several unconfirmed reports occurred between 1996 and 1998 but a survey undertaken in 2000 failed to find any individuals. The reasons for the population's reduction are unknown but potential threats include disease, habitat loss, habitat alteration due to invasive weeds, predation from species such as cats and black rats, small population size, and mortality from road traffic. Its disappearance in recent times might be caused by the accidentally introduced yellow crazy ant (Anoplolepis gracilipes), which is a dangerous threat for many terrestrial animals on Christmas Island.

Trypanosoma disease 
The theory of Durham (1908) and Pickering and Norris (1996) report that the decline of two endemic rats may be attributed to the infection of the Christmas Island shrew, according to local researchers. This forest dwelling mammal was at first thought to have vanished by 1908, probably due to a trypanosoma disease carried by introduced black rats, which is also considered a likely cause of the extinctions of Maclear's rat and the bulldog rat. The initial drop in C. trichura’s population size occurred around the same time as the introduction of the Rattus rattus (the black rat), which carried a murid trypanosome. Evidence of the black rat and/or the parasite causing the Christmas Island shrew's population decline is not solid.

Gecarcoidea natalis 
Another theory on the decline of Crocidura trichura is linked to the demise of the two endemic rats, and the competition left amongst the Christmas Island shrew and the Christmas Island red crab (Gecarcoidea natalis) for leaf litter resources. The decline of predator rat species allowed for the quickened rise of G. natalis, a usual prey of the rats. This could have forced C. trichura into new habitats such as tree canopies, or sites with low crab abundances. The population of C. trichura may have been pressured by their vulnerability during weaning. They left the nest immediately and tended to aimlessly wander as juveniles, making them vulnerable to predation by crabs.

Recovery 
The Australian Government has adopted a recovery plan for the Christmas Island shrew consisting of two stages of objectives

Stage 1:  
 Clarify the taxonomic status of the Christmas Island Shrew 
 Clarify the current status and distribution 
 Develop a Wildlife Management program for the habitat 
 Control abundance and spread of Yellow Crazy Ants 
 Implement community awareness program that may assist in the location of previously unknown populations 
Stage 2:
 Establish Captive breeding populations from any wild populations of shrews found
 Effectively protect and manage wildlife population 
 Identify Habitat critical to survival including shelter, breeding, and foraging habitat
 Determine and mitigate threatening processes affecting populations
The Australian Government also believes that habitat protection from or eradication of the Yellow Crazy Ant is vital in order for the species to fully recover. The Yellow Ant is known to be extremely destructive to the ecosystem on Christmas Island, often killing land crabs, endemic reptiles, and a wide range of native invertebrate. The Yellow Crazy Ants are believed to be a danger to all mammals, birds, and reptiles on the island because the ants either act as predators to the species or deplete its resources and destroy the habitat in which the species lives, causing loss of life in both scenarios.

References

External links
 

Crocidura
Fauna of Christmas Island
Mammals of Oceania
Critically endangered fauna of Oceania
Mammals described in 1889

ca:Crocidura trichura